First Amendment audits are a largely American social movement that usually involves photographing or filming from a public space. It is often categorized by its practitioners, known as auditors, as activism and citizen journalism that tests constitutional rights, in particular the right to photograph and video record in a public space (a right normally covered by the fourth amendment). Auditors believe that the movement promotes transparency and open government.  Critics argue that audits are often confrontational in nature, as auditors often refuse to self-identify or explain their activities. Some auditors have also been known to enter public buildings asserting that they have a legal right to openly carry firearms (a right covered by the second amendment, not the first), leading to accusations that auditors are engaged in intimidation, terrorism, and/or the sovereign citizen movement.

Auditors tend to film or photograph government buildings, equipment, access control points, and sensitive areas, as well as any law enforcement or military personnel present. Auditors have been detained, arrested, assaulted, had camera equipment confiscated, weapons aimed at them, their homes raided by a SWAT team, and have been shot while video recording in a public place. Such events have prompted police officials to release information on the proper methods of handling such an activity. For example, a document sponsored by the International Association of Chiefs of Police states that the use of a recording device alone is not grounds for arrest, unless other laws are violated.

The practice is predominantly an American concept, but it has also been seen in other countries including the United Kingdom, Canada, India, and Russia.

Behavior

Auditors typically travel to places considered public property, such as sidewalks or public right-of-ways, or places open to the public, such as post offices, police stations, public libraries or other government buildings, and visibly and openly photograph and record buildings and persons in their view.

In the case of sidewalk or easement audits, the conflict arises when a property owner or manager states, in substance, that photography of their property is not allowed. Sometimes, auditors will tell property owners upon questioning that they are photographing or recording for a story, they are photographing or recording for their "personal use", or sometimes auditors do not answer questions. Frequently, local law enforcement is called and the auditor is sometimes reported as a suspicious person and are often also identified as having been on private property. Some officers will approach the auditors and request his or her identification and an explanation of their conduct. Auditors refusing to identify sometimes results in officers arresting auditors for obstruction of justice, disorderly conduct, or other potential or perceived crimes.

An auditor selects a public facility and then films the entire encounter with staff and customers alike. If no confrontation or attempt to stop the filming occurs, then the facility passes the audit; if an employee attempts to stop a filming event, it fails the audit.

Intimidation 
Auditing can be controversial due to the confrontational tactics of some auditors, which has been criticized as intimidation or harassment. While filming in public is legal, such activity may cause some people to feel alarmed. Some auditors cite independent research into relevant laws, pointing out that they are currently being recorded by cameras in the building, or by stating that there is no expectation of privacy in public. 

Some auditors will purposefully engage in argumentative, harassing or outright aggressive behavior in order to solicit a reaction from government employees, especially law enforcement. Such tactics often lead to a physical altercation or arrest, which can increase the popularity of a video and in turn generate more income for the auditor. According to a report by The Daily Beast, the growing popularity of auditing videos online has led to "ruthless competition" between auditors, which incentivizes more dramatic videos.

Legality

The legality of recording in public was first clearly established in the United States following the case of Glik v. Cunniffe, which confirmed that restricting a person's right to film in public would violate their First and Fourth amendment rights. As the 7th Circuit Federal Court of Appeals explained in ACLU v. Alvarez, "[t]he act of making an audio or audiovisual recording is necessarily included within the First Amendment's guarantee of speech and press rights as a corollary of the right to disseminate the resulting recording. The right to publish or broadcast an audio or audiovisual recording would be insecure, or largely ineffective, if the antecedent act of making the recording is wholly unprotected." The legality of the auditors' actions beyond mere filming are frequently subject to debate. As long as the auditor remains in a public place where they are legally allowed to be, they have the right to record anything in plain view, subject to time, place, and manner restrictions.

Some auditors yell insults, derogatory language, and vulgarities at police officers who attempt to stop them from recording or improperly demand identification. Police will sometimes charge auditors with disorderly conduct when they engage in behavior that could be considered unlawful.  For example, an auditor in San Antonio was prosecuted and convicted of disorderly conduct after an audit. After the trial, the Chief of Police for the City of San Antonio stated "[the verdict] puts a dagger in the heart of their First Amendment excuse for insulting police officers..." Despite the San Antonio Police Chief's statement, insulting the police is consistently treated as constitutionally protected speech.

The rights exercised in a typical audit are freedom of speech and freedom of the press in the First Amendment, freedom from unreasonable searches and seizures in the Fourth Amendment, and the right to remain silent in the Fifth Amendment of the United States Constitution.

Goal 
One auditor stated that the goal of an audit is to "put yourself in places where you know chances are the cops are going to be called. Are they going to uphold the constitution, uphold the law ... or break the law?" Auditors state that they seek to educate the public that photography is not a crime, while publicizing cases where officers illegally stop what is perceived as illegal conduct.

In 2017, Judge Jacques Wiener of the U.S. Court of Appeals for the 5th Circuit wrote a federal appeals decision in favor of an auditor who was detained for filming police officers; "Filming the police contributes to the public's ability to hold the police accountable, ensure that police officers are not abusing their power, and make informed decisions about police policy."

Online videos of audits can also generate income for auditors through advertising revenue and donations.

See also 
 Photography Is Not a Crime

References 

Freedom of expression in the United States
First Amendment to the United States Constitution